Dilolo is a town in  Lualaba province, Democratic Republic of the Congo. It lies within five miles of the eastern bank of the Luao River, the DRC-Angolan border, and the Angolan town of Luau, at an altitude of 3510 ft (1069 m).

Transport

Road
The city is crossed by Transafican Highway 9 (TAH 9), which connects it to the cities of Luau and Divuma.

Rail
The city has a train station, which receives trains from the Benguela railway.

Airport
The town is served by Dilolo Airport, and by Luau International Airport (Luau, Angola)

References 

Populated places in Lualaba Province